Jurong Town Hall MRT station is a future elevated Mass Rapid Transit (MRT) station on the Jurong Region Line in Jurong East, Singapore.

History
On 9 May 2018, LTA announced that Jurong Town Hall station would be part of the proposed Jurong Region line (JRL). The station will be constructed as part of Phase 2, JRL (East), consisting of 7 stations between Tengah and Pandan Reservoir, and is expected to be completed in 2028.

Contract J109 for the design and construction of Jurong Town Hall Station and associated viaducts was awarded to Daewoo Engineering & Construction Co. Pte Ltd - Yongnam Engineering and Construction Pte Ltd Joint Venture at a sum of S$320.4 million in July 2020. Construction is expected to start in 2020. Contract J109 also includes the design and construction of the Toh Guan and Pandan Reservoir stations and the  associated viaducts.

Initially expected to open in 2027, the restrictions on the construction due to the COVID-19 pandemic has led to delays in the JRL line completion, and the date was pushed to 2028.

Location
The station complex will be next to Jurong Town Hall Road, at the junction with the International Business Park (IBP) roundabout. It is located in the Jurong East planning area between the International Business Park and Lakeside Subzones.

The station will have six exits on each side of the Jurong Town Hall Road.

Details
Jurong Town Hall station will serve the Jurong Region line (JRL) and have an official station code of JE6. Due to the station's proximity to the nearby Jurong Lake District MRT station on the Cross Island line, transport minister Iswaran stated a connection between the two stations is being studied, but added that the two stations are intended to serve "different commuter movement objectives".

References

Mass Rapid Transit (Singapore) stations
Proposed railway stations in Singapore
Railway stations scheduled to open in 2028